is a railway station in the city of  Nikaho, Akita, Japan, operated by JR East.

Lines
Kisakata Station is served by the Uetsu Main Line, and is located 203.4 km from the terminus of the line at Niitsu Station.

Station layout
The station consists of one side platform and one island platform connected to the station building by a footbridge. The station is staffed.

Platforms

History
Kisakata Station opened on November 15, 1921 as a station on the Japanese Government Railways (JGR) Rikuusai Line. It was switched to the control of the JGR Uetsu Main Line on April 20, 1924. The JGR became the JNR (Japan National Railway) after World War II. A new station building was completed in November 1966. With the privatization of the JNR on April 1, 1987, the station came under the control of the East Japan Railway Company. The station was renovated in October 2012.

Passenger statistics
In fiscal 2018, the station was used by an average of 191 passengers daily (boarding passengers only).

Surrounding area
 Nikaho City Hall

References

External links

  JR East Station information 

Railway stations in Japan opened in 1921
Railway stations in Akita Prefecture
Uetsu Main Line
Nikaho, Akita